Air Création is a French manufacturer of ultralight and light-sport aircraft. The company was founded in 1982 and has since produced more than 5,500 aircraft. Current product portfolio includes the two seat Tanarg and the GTE Trek. The single-seat FAR 103 compliant Racer was produced for 25 years, from 1985 to 2010.

The company is located at Lanas Airport in Aubenas, France.

Aircraft
Air Creation Racer
Air Creation GT
Air Creation Clipper
Air Creation Tanarg
Air Creation Trek
Air Creation Twin
Air Creation Pixel
Air Creation Skypper

References

External links

 Air Création Home Page

Aircraft manufacturers of France
Manufacturing companies established in 1982
French companies established in 1982
Companies based in Auvergne-Rhône-Alpes